4275 is the debut studio album by American singer-songwriter Jacquees. It was released on June 15, 2018, by Cash Money Records. It features guest appearances from Birdman, Trey Songz, Chris Brown, Dej Loaf and Young Thug, among others.

Background 
Jacquees first announced the album through his Instagram page on May 15, 2018. The album's second single, "Inside" featuring Trey Songz, was released on May 18. The album's third single, "You", was released on September 7.

Track listing
Credits adapted from Tidal.

Notes
  signifies a co-producer.
 "All About Us" features additional vocals from Nyielle Hansley, Tyler Ragin, Tobias Douthit and Cherish Douglass.

Charts

Certifications

References

Jacquees albums
2018 debut albums
Cash Money Records albums
Republic Records albums